The men's individual all-around competition was one of eight events for male competitors in artistic gymnastics at the 2000 Summer Olympics in Sydney. The qualification and final rounds took place on September 16 and 20 at the Sydney SuperDome. There were 97 competitors from 32 nations. Each nation could enter a team of 6 gymnasts (returning to the longstanding team size after one Games of teams of 7 in 1996) or up to 2 individual gymnasts. The event was won by Alexei Nemov of Russia, the nation's first victory in the event. Nemov, with a silver medal in 1996, became the 12th man to earn multiple medals in the all-around. Yang Wei of China took silver. Oleksandr Beresch earned bronze, Ukraine's first medal in the event.

Background

This was the 23rd appearance of the men's individual all-around. The first individual all-around competition had been held in 1900, after the 1896 competitions featured only individual apparatus events. A men's individual all-around has been held every Games since 1900.

Three of the top 10 gymnasts from the 1996 Games returned: silver medalist Alexei Nemov of Russia, seventh-place finisher John Roethlisberger of the United States, and tenth-place finisher Blaine Wilson of the United States. Russia's Nikolai Kryukov was the reigning (1999) World Champion; Ivan Ivankov of Belarus had won the 1997 World Championship.

Latvia made its debut in the event. France made its 21st appearance, most among nations.

Competition format

Major changes to the competition format were implemented in 2000. The competition continued to use a preliminary (qualifying) round and a final round, with scores cleared between rounds (no carryover). However, the preliminary round now used only one optional exercise for each apparatus rather than requiring both a compulsory and optional exercise. The team event scoring used a 6–5–4 format (each team had 6 gymnasts, selected 5 per apparatus, with 4 scores counting), a reduced version of the 1996 7–6–5 system, which reduced the number of gymnasts competing in every apparatus. Total scores and an overall rank were still used for all gymnasts, however. 2000 was also the year where the tie-breaking rules came into effect, which resulted in far less tie rankings or duplicate of medals than at the Games before that. Each exercise was scored from 0 to 10; thus the total preliminary score was from 0 to 60. The final total, with six exercises, was from 0 to 60.

Schedule

All times are Australian Eastern Standard Time (UTC+10)

Results

There were 97 gymnasts that competed during the qualification round on September 16, though only 52 competed on each apparatus. Fifty-three gymnasts competed in the all-around during the qualification round. The thirty-six highest scoring gymnasts advanced to the final on September 16. Each country was limited to three competitors in the final.

References

External links
Official Olympic Report
www.gymnasticsresults.com

Men's artistic individual all-around
2000
Olympics
Men's events at the 2000 Summer Olympics